The 24th Pennsylvania House of Representatives District is in southwestern Pennsylvania and has been represented by La'Tasha D. Mayes since 2023.

District profile 
The 24th District is located in Allegheny County and includes the following area:

 Pittsburgh (part)
 Ward 04 (part) 
Division 03 
Division 04
Division 06 
Division 07 
Division 18 
Ward 05 (part)
Division 03 
Division 04 
Division 05 
Division 06
Division 07 
Division 08 
Division 09 
Division 10 
Division 11 
Division 12 
Division 13 
Division 14 
Division 15 
Division 17 
Division 18
Ward 07 (part)
Division 03 
Division 04 
Division 08 
Division 09 
Division 11 
Division 12 
Ward 08 
Ward 10 (part)
Division 08 
Division 09 
Division 11 
Division 12 
Division 13 
Division 14 
Division 15 
Division 16 
Division 17
Division 18 
Division 19 
Ward 11 
Ward 12 
Ward 13 (part)
Division 02 
Division 03
Division 04 
Division 05
Division 06 
Division 07 
Division 09 
Division 11 
Division 12 
Division 15 
Division 16 
Division 17 
Division 18 
Division 19

Representatives

Recent election results

References

External links 
 District map from the United States Census Bureau
 Pennsylvania House Legislative District Maps from the Pennsylvania Redistricting Commission.
 Population Data for District 24 from the Pennsylvania Redistricting Commission.

Government of Allegheny County, Pennsylvania
24